Last Words: The Final Recordings is the eighth and final studio album by the American rock band the Screaming Trees. The album itself was recorded two years after their album Dust. Shortly after Dust was released, Epic Records decided to drop the band. However, in the years of 1998 and 1999, the band recorded the album in Pearl Jam's guitarist Stone Gossard's studio. Due to the band's break-up in 2000, and Mark Lanegan's refusal to perform with the band, the album wasn't released for twelve years until drummer Barrett Martin released it on his own label, Sunyata Records. The album received mixed reviews.

Track listing

Personnel
 Screaming Trees
 Mark Lanegan — lead vocals
 Gary Lee Conner — lead guitar, piano, clavinet, backing vocals
 Van Conner — bass guitar, backing vocals
 Barrett Martin — drums, Hammond organ, Fender Rhodes, vibraphone, percussion

 Additional musicians
 Peter Buck – guitars
 Josh Homme – guitar on "Crawlspace"

References

Screaming Trees albums
2011 albums